This article lists the squads for the 2018 Algarve Cup, the 25th edition of the Algarve Cup. The cup consisted of a series of friendly games, and was held in the Algarve region of Portugal from 28 February to 7 March 2018. The twelve national teams involved in the tournament registered a squad of 23 players.

The age listed for each player is as of 28 February 2018, the first day of the tournament. The numbers of caps and goals listed for each player do not include any matches played after the start of tournament. The club listed is the club for which the player last played a competitive match prior to the tournament. The nationality for each club reflects the national association (not the league) to which the club is affiliated. A flag is included for coaches that are of a different nationality than their own national team.

Group A

Australia
Coach: Alen Stajcic

The squad was announced on 20 February 2018. Rachel Lowe replaced Emily Gielnik on 21 February 2018.

China
Coach:  Sigurður Ragnar Eyjólfsson

The squad was announced on 14 February 2018.

Norway
Coach:  Martin Sjögren

The majority of the squad was announced on 12 February 2018, with Sjögren announcing 19 players. Five more players were announced on 20 February 2018.

Portugal
Coach: Francisco Neto

The squad was announced on 19 February 2018.

Group B

Canada
Coach:  Kenneth Heiner-Møller

The squad was announced on 14 February 2018.

Russia
Coach: Elena Fomina

The squad was announced on 22 February 2018.

South Korea
Coach: Yoon Deok-yeo

The squad was announced on 10 February 2018.

Sweden
Coach: Peter Gerhardsson

The squad was announced on 13 February 2018. Anna Oscarsson replaced Nilla Fischer on 20 February 2018. Sandra Adolfsson replaced Nathalie Björn on 21 February 2018. Amanda Edgren replaced Lina Hurtig on 27 February 2018.

Group C

Denmark
Coach: Lars Søndergaard

Iceland
Coach: Freyr Alexandersson

The squad was announced on 15 February 2018. Berglind Björg Þorvaldsdóttir replaced Sigrún Ella Einarsdóttir on 26 February 2018.

Japan
Coach: Asako Takakura

The squad was announced on 9 February 2018.

Netherlands
Coach: Sarina Wiegman

The squad was announced on 20 February 2018.

Player representation

By club
Clubs with 5 or more players represented are listed.

By club nationality

By club federation

By representatives of domestic league

References

2018 squads
squad